David Luque-Velasco (born 2 March 1984) is a Spanish former professional tennis player.

Luque-Velasco, a Catalan player, made his only ATP Tour main draw appearance at the 2006 Estoril Open as a lucky loser from qualifying and lost his first round match to Fred Gil in three sets. His career high singles ranking was 565 in the world. He has also competed on the World Padel Tour.

ITF Futures titles

Doubles: (1)

References

External links
 
 

1984 births
Living people
Spanish male tennis players
Tennis players from Barcelona